Windhoek Central Hospital is a public hospital in Windhoek, Namibia. Together with the Katutura State Hospital, it is one of two State Hospitals in the city. The hospital was commissioned in 1982, and opened in 1984.

References

External links

Buildings and structures in Windhoek
Hospitals in Namibia
Hospitals established in 1984
1984 establishments in South West Africa